In political science, Noopolitik, formed by a combination of the Greek words νόος nóos ("knowledge") and  πολιτικός politikós (πολίτης polítēs "citizen", from πόλις pólis "city"), is the network-based geopolitics of knowledge. The term was invented by defense experts John Arquilla and David Ronfeldt in a 1999 RAND Corporation study and often appears in connection with that of smart power.

Difference with Realpolitik
Noopolitics is an informational strategy of manipulating international processes through the forming in the general public, by means of mass media, of positive or negative attitudes to the external or internal policies of a state or block of states, to create a positive or negative image of ideas and promulgated moral values.

Versus Foucault's Biopolitics
Tiziana Terranova (2007) describes the use of the term 'noopolitics' by Maurizio Lazzarato (2004). "'Noopolitics' supplements the biopolitics of the species described by Foucault" (Terranova 2007, 139). "Against the militarization of communication accomplished by new techniques of power, it is possible to think about the constitution of such publics as counter-weapons, which work by expressing, inventing and creating possible worlds where the moment of resistance (the 'no' by which one refuses to watch, listen or believe) is the starting point for an affirmative activity" (Terranova 2007, 140). Noyer & Juanals (2008) have also discussed Noopolitik as a means of social control. especially in connection with RAND's Byting back program which was published as research into counterinsurgency.

In the knowledge economy and the BRICS
While the term initially appeared in association with the concept of the US Revolution in Military Affairs, Noopolitik has also come to describe an interest in the knowledge economy and in particular innovation and R&D to leverage growth and political reach in international relations. Thus Noopolitik may be defined as the use of innovation and knowledge to leverage political intercourses by other means at the international level. Such "knowledge race" may be either a means of asserting political independence or of generating a sudden gap in the geopolitical balance of power.

For the People's Republic of China
Professor Li Xiguang of Tsinghua University described the stakes of Smart power for the People's Republic of China in a 2010 article on Noopolitik in the Global Times:

 analyzes Noopolitik as a defining stance of the People's Republic of China's economic policy in which he concludes "Maintaining 'Leap and Bound' creativity could be an efficient way for China to neutralize popular frustration. What must be acknowledged is that the PRC has moved from a 'growth panacea' policy, to a policy of 'knowledge panacea.' This best sums up its Noopolitik."

See also
 Holism
 Netpolitik
 Noogenesis
 Noosphere
 Pierre Teilhard de Chardin

Sources
 John Arquilla & David Ronfeldt: "The Emergence of Noopolitik: Toward an American Information Strategy", Rand 1999
 Terranova, Tiziana . “Futurepublic: On Information Warfare, Bio-racism and Hegemony as Noopolitics.” Theory, Culture & Society 24.3 (2007): 125–145.
 Lazzarato, Maurizio (2004) La politica dell’evento. Cosenza: Rubbettino.

Further reading
 Mohammad Ganjidoost: "", USC Center on Public Diplomacy, July 24, 2006.
 David Ronfeldt and John Arquilla: "The promise of Noöpolitik", First Monday, August, 2007

International relations